Baurci is a commune and village in Moldova, located in the autonomous territorial unit Gagauzia,  west of the city of Ceadâr-Lunga. This is the third largest village in Gagauzia, after Congaz and Copceac. At the 2004 census, there were 8,783 inhabitants in Baurci.

Demographics 
At the 2004 census:
 8,597 (97.8%) Gagauz
  53 (0.6%) Moldovans
  41 (0.5%) Bulgarians
  44 (0.5%) Russians
  29 (0.3%) Ukrainians
  15 (0.2%) Gypsies
  4 (0.1%) other

References

Communes of Gagauzia